Vlastimil Hála (July 7, 1924– July 29, 1985) was a Czech jazz trumpeter, composer, and arranger. During the period of 1947–1964 he worked as arranger for Karel Vlach's orchestra. Hála's textbook on instrumentation has not lost its significance even in our day.

References

External links 

1924 births
1985 deaths
Musicians from Most (city)
Czech jazz musicians
Czech male classical composers
20th-century trumpeters
20th-century Czech male musicians